The full name of SENSE Lab  is Sensory Encoding and Neuro- Sensory Engineering Lab in Halifax, Nova Scotia, Canada. It integrates Engineering and physiologic sciences in hearing (communication) and balance.

The lab have a clinical focus on disorders of the ear, audition and balance. They are a physiologic and engineering focus on all aspects of communication, balance regulation and auditory and vestibular perception.

They are particularly interested in multisensory integration, environmental-sensory interactions, and cognitive-sensory interactions. Their research encompasses novel transducers, novel measurement devices and novel complex probes of sensory and cognitive function. They also develop commercial and general consumer applications in these areas.

The research facility is located in the Division of Otolaryngology, Department of Surgery, Capital District Health Authority, Halifax, and is affiliated with the Department of Biomed Engineering, School of Human Communication Disorders, the Department of Psychology, School of Physiotherapy, and the Department of Anatomy & Neurobiology, Dalhousie University.

References

External links

Cognitive science research institutes
Biomedical engineering
Dalhousie University